Troy Jones (born 11 June 1988) is an American kickboxer who competes in the Glory Kickboxing welterweight division.

Martial arts career
Jones made his Glory debut against Paul Banasiak at Glory 52: Los Angeles on March 31, 2018. He won the fight by unanimous decision.

After notching stoppage victories against Kit Ruddock at MECCA XII on May 12, 2018, and Ariel Abreu at Friday Night Fights on June 16, 2018, Jones was scheduled to face Casey Greene at Glory 58: Chicago on September 14, 2018. He won the fight by a first-round head kick knockout.

Jones was scheduled to face Omari Boyd at Glory 63: Houston on February 1, 2019. He won the fight by unanimous decision.

Jones was scheduled to face Ammari Diedrick at Glory 68: Miami on September 28, 2019. He won the fight by a first-round technical knockout.

Jones was scheduled to face Murthel Groenhart for the interim Glory Welterweight Championship at Glory 70: Lyon on October 26, 2019. He took the fight on a short notice, as a replacement for Cédric Doumbé. He lost the fight by a second-round knockout.

Jones was scheduled to face Miguel Angel Padilla for the WMC Pan American 170 lbs title at TRIUMPHANT 11 on June 12, 2021. He won the fight by a first-round technical knockout.

Jones was scheduled to face Alim Nabiev at Glory: Collision 3 on October 23, 2021. He lost the fight by unanimous decision.

Titles and accomplishments

Amateur
 2014 Thai Boxing Association Novice 185 lbs Champion 
 2014 Annual Muay Thai Classic C-Class Champion
 2015 Extreme Striking Promotions Welterweight Champion
 2015 IFMA Royal World Cup B-Class -75kg 
 2015 Annual Muay Thai Classic A-Class Champion
 2016 Friday Night Fights Super Middleweight Champion
 2016 IFMA Pan American Games 

Professional
 2017 Bangla Stadium Champion
 2021 WMC Pan American 170 lbs Champion

Kickboxing record

|-  style="background:#fbb"
| 2021-10-23|| Loss ||align=left| Alim Nabiev || Glory: Collision 3 || Arnhem, Netherlands || Decision (Unanimous) || 3 || 3:00
|-
|-  style="text-align:center; background:#cfc;"
| 2021-06-12 || Win ||align=left| Miguel Angel Padilla || TRIUMPHANT 11 || Miami, USA || TKO (Punches) ||1  ||  
|-
! style=background:white colspan=9 |
|- align="center" bgcolor= "#FFBBBB"
| 2019-10-26|| Loss ||align=left| Murthel Groenhart || Glory 70: Lyon || Lyon, France || KO (Punches) || 2 || 2:38  
|-
! style=background:white colspan=9 |
|- style="text-align:center; background:#cfc;"
| 2019-09-28|| Win ||align=left| Ammari Diedrick || Glory 68: Miami || Miami, United States || TKO (3 Knockdowns Rule) || 1 || 2:28
|- style="text-align:center; background:#cfc;"
| 2019-02-01|| Win ||align=left| Omari Boyd || Glory 63: Houston || Houston, USA || Decision (Unanimous) || 3 || 3:00
|- style="text-align:center; background:#cfc;"
| 2018-09-14|| Win ||align=left| Casey Greene || Glory 58: Chicago || Chicago, United States || KO (Head kick) || 1 || 1:00
|- style="text-align:center; background:#cfc;"
| 2018-06-16|| Win ||align=left| Ariel Abreu || Friday Night Fights ||  New York, United States || KO (Right elbow) || 1 || 1:20
|- style="text-align:center; background:#cfc;"
| 2018-05-12|| Win ||align=left| Kit Ruddock || MECCA XII ||  Minnesota, United States || KO (Right elbow) || 3 ||
|- style="text-align:center; background:#cfc;"
| 2018-03-31|| Win ||align=left| Paul Banasiak || Glory 52: Los Angeles || Los Angeles, United States || Decision (Unanimous) || 3 || 3:00
|- style="text-align:center; background:#cfc;"
| 2017-06-21|| Win ||align=left|  || Bangla Boxing Stadium || Phuket, Thailand || KO (Straight right) || 2 ||
|- style="text-align:center; background:#fbb;"
| 2017-06-04 || Loss ||align=left| Pornsawan Petchrambo || Max Muay Thai|| Thailand || KO  || 1 ||
|- style="text-align:center; background:#cfc;"
| 2017-03-22 || Win ||align=left|  || WMO international Thai martial arts festival, Final || Bangkok, Thailand || ||  ||
|- style="text-align:center; background:#cfc;"
| 2017-03-20 || Win ||align=left|  || WMO international Thai martial arts festival, Semi Final || Bangkok, Thailand || TKO (Right kick)|| 2 ||
|- style="text-align:center; background:#cfc;"
| 2017-02-19 || Win||align=left| Armin || Bangla Boxing Stadium || Phuket, Thailand || TKO (Doctor Stoppage/Elbow) || 2 ||
|- style="text-align:center; background:#cfc;"
| 2017-01-27 || Win ||align=left|  || Bangla Boxing Stadium || Phuket, Thailand || TKO (Left body knee) || 3 ||  
|-
| colspan=9 | Legend:    

|- style="background:#fbb;"
| 2017-07-29 || Loss ||align=left| Vitaly Gurkov || I.F.M.A. World Games 2017, Semi Finals -75 kg || Poland || TKO || 3 ||
|- style="background:#cfc;"
| 2017-07-28 || Win ||align=left| Johane Beausejour || I.F.M.A. World Games 2017, Quarter Finals -75 kg || Poland || Decision || 3 || 3:00
|- style="background:#cfc;"
| 2016-12-04|| Win ||align=left| Giovanni Mazzetti || I.F.M.A. World Muaythai 2016 Pan American Games, Finals || Lima, Peru || Decision || 3 || 3:00 
|-
! style=background:white colspan=9 |
|- style="background:#cfc;"
| 2016-12-03|| Win ||align=left| Scott Mackenzie  || I.F.M.A. World Muaythai 2016 Pan American Games, Semi Finals || Lima, Peru || Decision || 3 || 3:00
|- style="background:#cfc;"
| 2016-12-02|| Win ||align=left|  || I.F.M.A. World Muaythai 2016 Pan American Games, Quarter Finals || Lima, Peru || Forfeit ||  ||
|- style="background:#cfc;"
| 2016-09-24 || Win ||align=left|  || Extreme Striking Promotions 10 || United States || TKO ||  ||   
|-
! style=background:white colspan=9 |
|- style="background:#cfc;"
| 2016-06-04 || Win ||align=left|   || Grand Casino Hinckley || New York, United States ||  ||  ||
|-
! style=background:white colspan=9 |
|- style="background:#fbb;"
| 2016-05-25|| Loss ||align=left| Tengnueng Sitjaesairoong || I.F.M.A. World Muaythai 2016 Championships || Sweden ||  ||  ||
|- style="background:#cfc;"
| 2016-05-21|| Win ||align=left|   || I.F.M.A. World Muaythai 2016 Championships || Sweden || KO || 1 ||
|- style="background:#cfc;"
| 2016-04-29 || Win ||align=left| Ramon Maldonado  || Friday Night Fights || New York, United States || Decision (Unanimous) || 5 || 3:00  
|-
! style=background:white colspan=9 |
|- style="background:#c5d2ea;"
| 2016-01-16|| No Contest ||align=left| Jason Strzelecki  || DRILLER PROMOTIONS MECCA 7 || Minnesota, United States ||  || 1 ||  
|-
! style=background:white colspan=9 |
|- style="background:#cfc;"
| 2015-08|| Win ||align=left| Osman Ceken || IFMA Royal World Cup, Final || Bangkok, Thailand || Decision ||  ||  
|-
! style=background:white colspan=9 |
|- style="background:#cfc;"
| 2015-08|| Win ||align=left| Aittainoun || IFMA Royal World Cup, Semi Final || Bangkok, Thailand || TKO ||  ||
|- style="background:#cfc;"
| 2015-08|| Win ||align=left| Tomas Mendez || IFMA Royal World Cup, Quarter Final || Bangkok, Thailand || Decision  ||  ||
|- style="background:#cfc;"
| 2015-08|| Win ||align=left| Yani || IFMA Royal World Cup, Round of 16 || Bangkok, Thailand || TKO ||  ||
|- style="background:#cfc;"
| 2015-05-27|| Win ||align=left|  || Thai Boxing Association, Final || Iowa, United States || KO ||  ||  
|-
! style=background:white colspan=9 |
|- style="background:#cfc;"
| 2015-05-26|| Win ||align=left|  || Thai Boxing Association, Semi Final || Iowa, United States || KO ||  ||
|- style="background:#cfc;"
| 2015-05-25|| Win ||align=left| || Thai Boxing Association, Quarter Final || Iowa, United States || Decision (Unanimous)|| ||
|- style="background:#cfc;"
| 2015-02-21|| Win ||align=left| Tyler Durocher || Extreme Striking Promotions 9|| United States ||  ||  ||  
|-
! style=background:white colspan=9 |
|- style="background:#cfc;"
| 2014-03-01|| Win ||align=left|  || Unite Fight Charity || United States ||  ||  ||  
|-
! style=background:white colspan=9 |
|-
| colspan=9 | Legend:

See also
 List of male kickboxers

References

1988 births
Living people
American male kickboxers
Glory kickboxers
Sportspeople from Chicago